Surakarta Sunanate (Kasunanan/Karaton Surakarta Hadiningrat) was a Javanese monarchy centred in the city of Surakarta, in the province of Central Java, Indonesia.

The Surakarta Kraton was established in 1745 by Pakubuwono II. Surakarta Sunanate and Yogyakarta Sultanate are together the successors of Mataram Sultanate. Unlike their counterparts in Yogyakarta, who use the title of sultan, the rulers of Surakarta use the title of sunan. The Dutch name was used during Dutch colonial rule until the 1940s.

History

After Sultan Agung I, the power and prestige of Sultanate of Mataram was declining due to a power struggle and conflict of succession within the royal family. The VOC (Dutch East India Company) exploited the power struggle to increase its control on Java, and manage to gain concessions of Mataram's former colony in Priangan and Semarang. The Mataram seat in Plered near Kotagede collapsed after the Trunojoyo revolt in 1677. Sunan Amral (Amangkurat II) relocated the palace to Kartasura. During the reign of Sunan Pakubuwono II, in 1742 Raden Mas Garendi (Sunan Kuning) led Chinese mercenaries and launched a revolt against the crown and also VOC. Raden Mas Garendi was the son of Prince Teposono and also the grandson of Amangkurat II. The rebels managed to take control of the Kartasura capital and ousted Pakubuwono II who fled and sought refuge in Ponorogo. With the help of Adipati Cakraningrat IV the ruler of western Madura, Pakubuwono II regained the capital and cracked down on the rebellion. However the palace of Kartasura was destroyed and considered inauspicious since the bloodbath took place there. Pakubuwono II decided to build a new palace and capital city in Sala (Solo) village. The transfer of the capital to Sala village is commemorated in chandrasengkala (chronogram) "Kombuling Pudya Kepyarsihing Nata" which corresponds to Wednesday 12 Sura 1670 Javanese year (17 February 1745). The date  is considered the day that the Surakarta Sunanate was established.

Pakubuwono II faced numerous rebellions, among other from Raden Mas Said, and later from his own younger brother, Prince Mangkubumi who joined Mas Said's rebellion in 1746. Pakubuwono II died from illness in 1749, but before he died, he entrusted the royal affairs of Surakarta to his trusted protector, Baron von Hohendorff, a VOC officer. On behalf of the successor of Pakubuwono II, Pakubuwono III, the VOC manage to broker a peace negotiation with Prince Mangkubumi. The peace deal was reached with Mataram Sultanate being split in two based on the Treaty of Giyanti of 13 February 1755: Yogyakarta Sultanate under the rule of Prince Mangkubumi who was later stylised as Hamengkubuwono I and Surakarta Sunanate under Pakubuwono III.
The Giyanti Treaty named Pangeran Mangkubumi as Sultan of Yogyakarta. During the era of Dutch rule, there were recognised two main principalities of Vorstenlanden Mataram, the Surakarta Sunanate and The Yogyakarta Sultanate. Then a few years later Surakarta was divided further with the establishment of the Mangkunegaran Princedom after the Treaty of Salatiga (17 March 1757). The Mangkunegaran Princedom was led by notorious rebel Raden Mas Said who was stylised as Mangkunegara I. The territory of Surakarta Sunanate were reduced much further after the Java War (1825–1830) led by Prince Diponegoro. Susuhunan Pakubuwono VI was alleged to have secretly supported Diponegoro's rebellion, and as punishment after the Java War the Sunanate was obliged to surrender much of its lands to the Dutch.

Throughout the Dutch East Indies era, the Sunanate of Surakarta enjoyed autonomous status under the Vorstenlanden Mataram arrangements. Together with Sultanate of Yogyakarta, the Sunanate of Surakarta was considered as a vassal state of the Dutch Empire under royal patronage of Netherlands crown. The peak of the Surakarta Sunanate's prestige and power were during the reign of Pakubuwono X (1893–1939) when the Sunan renovated and enlarged the Surakarta palace and construct many infrastructure projects and buildings in Surakarta city. The kingdom faced an era of strife and uncertainty during World War II and the Japanese occupation of Indonesia.

After the declaration of independence of the Republic of Indonesia on 17 August 1945, followed by Indonesian National Revolution, the Surakarta Sunanate with Mangkunegaran Princedom sent a letter of confidence to Sukarno to demonstrate their support for the Indonesian Republic. As the reward the Republic awarded the status of Daerah Istimewa (Special Region, similar to today Yogyakarta Sultanate) within the Republic of Indonesia. However, because the political agitation and opposition from Indonesian communists that led to an anti-monarchy movement and rebellion in early 1946, on 16 June 1946 the Indonesian Republic aborted the special region status; both Surakarta's and Mangkunegara's status were reduced to merely a residence and were later merged into Central Java province.

In contrast, the Yogyakarta Sultanate has successfully maintained special status. Yogyakarta's historical support and close ties with the founding fathers of the Indonesian Republic during the war of independence and Indonesian national revolution. The Surakarta Sunanate holds no actual political power. Its power is limited to royal prestige and its special position in sustaining traditional Javanese culture. The prestige still remains, that leading many leaders and political figures in Indonesia to seek affiliations with the Sunanate.

Residences

The principal residence of the sunan is the kraton (palace), sometimes called the Surakarta Kraton or Kraton Solo but otherwise known in formal terms as Karaton Surakarta Hadiningrat.  As is the case with a number of other kratons in various cities in Java, the Surakarta Kraton has become quite neglected over the years. Very little funding is available for maintenance, many parts of the palace have been in an advanced states of decay.

See also

 Susuhunan of Surakarta, including list of sunans
 List of monarchs of Java

Further reading

External links
Karaton Surakarta Hadiningrat Royal Surakarta Sunanate official website  (archived from http://kratonsurakarta.com/)

References

Precolonial states of Indonesia
Former kingdoms
Surakarta
Islamic states in Indonesia
History of Java